This is a list of airlines currently operating in the Dutch Caribbean, that is, the Caribbean Islands that formerly comprised the Netherlands Antilles and remain part of the Kingdom of the Netherlands. The islands are Aruba, Curacao, and Sint Maartin, each of which is a constituent country of the Kingdom, as well as the special municipalities of Bonaire, Saba, and Sint Eustatius.

See also
 List of airlines
 List of defunct airlines of Netherlands Antilles

Netherlands Antilles
Airlines
Caribbean
Dutch